is a 2004 Japanese film directed by Takashi Ishii and starring Aya Sugimoto. It is based on the 1974 film Flower and Snake directed by Masaru Konuma and starring Naomi Tani. The earlier film, based on a novel by Oniroku Dan, was part of Nikkatsu's Roman Porno series. The 2004 version has been described as marking a "watershed moment in the history of Japanese film censorship" with "some of the most extravagant scenes of sexual cruelty and graphic nudity to be passed off as mainstream entertainment in any part of the world."

Plot
On the surface, Shizuko is a beautiful and talented tango dancer married to a handsome and successful businessman Takayoshi Tōyama, but she is troubled by recurrent masochistic dreams and her inability to be sexually aroused by her husband. But her husband is heavily indebted to gangsters and yakuza boss Kanzō Morita also has a video supplied by Kawada, a disgruntled former employee, which implicates Tōyama in a bribery scheme. Morita tells Tōyama that his only recourse is his beautiful wife who is an obsession to his mentor, the politically powerful Ippei Tashiro. When Tōyama finds that Tashiro is 95 years old, he convinces himself that turning his wife over to him will not be a major problem. When he brings his wife to the supposed masked ball, however, she is kidnapped and made part of a private bondage show for the elderly yakuza chief and his twisted friends. Shizuko resists at first but submits when her female bodyguard Kyōko (who has also been kidnapped) is submitted to sexual torture and threatened with death. Shizuko is then subjected to a series of punishments including abundant rope bondage. When her husband repents and finally reaches her after paying the yakuza, her only response is "Do me!". After more sexual adventures, she finally escapes, though it remains ambiguous as to whether she experienced was real or another of her masochistic dreams.

Cast
 Aya Sugimoto as Shizuko Tōyama
 Renji Ishibashi as Ippei Tashiro 
 Hironobu Nomura  as Takayoshi Tōyama
 Kenichi Endō as Kanzō Morita 
 Misaki  as Kyōko Nojima
 Yōzaburô Itō  as Clown man 
 Yoshiyuki Yamaguchi  as Ryō Eguchi
 Shun Nakayama as Kazuo Kawada
 Shigeo Kobayashi as Yoshizawa

Production
Masaru Konuma's 1974 version of Flower and Snake was the Nikkatsu studio's first venture into S&M oriented films. The 2004 film is related only by name and general theme to the earlier film but it shares much of the spirit of the Roman Porno S&M features. For the film, star Aya Sugimoto "worked closely with bondage master Go Arisue. Though Sugimoto spent roughly 75 percent of her screen time unclothed and participating in humiliating acts, she appeared every bit in control of her sexual composure."

Sequels
A sequel to the film, was released by Toei on May 14, 2005. Sugimoto reprised her role as Shizuko, but with a much older husband in this version. The locale is now Paris but the plot still centers on sado-masochism with Kenichi Endō as the artist Ikegami who leads Shizuko into his shadowy world. Toei released a second sequel to the film on August 28, 2010 as  but this time starring Minako Komukai as Shizuko. This sequel was directed by Yusuke Narita and featured an appearance by Kei Mizutani. A third sequel, Flower and Snake: Zero was released in 2014.

References

External links
 
 
 

2004 films
Japanese erotic films
Toei Company films
Films directed by Takashi Ishii
BDSM in films
Yakuza films
2000s Japanese films